Sega Water Ski is a "foot controller-based" simulation arcade game developed and released by Sega in 1997. The game was built on the Sega Model 2 hardware.

Gameplay
Like Top Skater, the Sega Water Ski machines use a foot controller, and the gameplay is also similar. The cabinet design was also similar to Top Skater. The gameplay focuses more on doing stunts on ramps under a time limit.

Rarity
Sega Water Ski is a rather rare Sega arcade game, like The Ocean Hunter and Sega Ski Super G are. Despite being rare, the game sold a lot of units worldwide.

Official soundtrack
A soundtrack containing music from this game and Motor Raid was released on January 21, 1998 by Marvelous Entertainment. It is also very rare.

Reception 
In Japan, Game Machine listed Sega Water Ski on their November 1, 1997 issue as being the seventh most-successful dedicated arcade game of the month.

References

External links 
 https://web.archive.org/web/20100712034815/http://www.segaarcade.com/archive/waterski.aspx

Arcade video games
Arcade-only video games
Sega arcade games
1997 video games
1998 soundtrack albums
Video games developed in Japan
Water sports video games